Andreï Sergueïevitch Makine (born 10 September 1957) is a French novelist. He also publishes under the pseudonym Gabriel Osmonde. Makine's novels include Dreams of My Russian Summers (1995) which won two top French awards, the Prix Goncourt and the Prix Médicis. He was elected to seat 5 of the Académie Française on 3 March 2016, succeeding Assia Djebar.

Biography
Andreï Makine was born in Krasnoyarsk, Russian SFSR, Soviet Union on 10 September 1957 and grew up in the city of Penza about 700 kilometres (435 mi) south-east of Moscow. As a boy, having acquired familiarity with France and its language from his French-born grandmother (it is not certain whether Makine had a French grandmother; in later interviews he claimed to have learned French from a friend), he wrote poems in both French and his native Russian.

In 1987, he went to France as a member of a teacher's exchange program and decided to stay. He was granted political asylum and was determined to make a living as a writer in French. However, Makine had to present his first manuscripts as translations from Russian to overcome publishers' skepticism that a newly arrived exile could write so fluently in a second language. After disappointing reactions to his first two novels, it took eight months to find a publisher for his fourth, Dreams of My Russian Summers. Finally published in 1995 in France, the novel became the first in history to win both the Prix Goncourt and the Prix Médicis plus the Prix Goncourt des Lycéens.

In 2001 Makine began secretively publishing as "Gabriel Osmonde", a total of four novels over ten years, the last appearing in 2011. It was a French literary mystery and many speculated about who Osmonde might be. Finally in 2011 a scholar noticed Osmonde's book 20,000 femmes dans la vie d'un homme had been inspired by Makine's Dreams of My Russian Summers and Makine confirmed that he was the author. Explaining why he used a pseudonym he said, "I wanted to create someone who lived far from the hurly-burly of the world".

Translations
All of Makine's novels have been translated into English by Geoffrey Strachan.

Le testament français was published in English as Dreams of My Russian Summers in the United States,  and under its  original French title in the United Kingdom. It has also been translated into Russian by Yuliana Yahnina and Natalya Shakhovskaya, and it was first published in Russian in 1996 in the 12th issue of Foreign Literature (Иностранная литература) literary magazine.

Bibliography 
 La Fille d'un héros de l'Union soviétique, 1990, Robert Laffont  (A Hero's Daughter, 1996 )
 Confession d'un porte-drapeau déchu, 1992, Belfond (Confessions of a Fallen Standard-Bearer, 1996 )
 Au temps du fleuve Amour, 1994, Editions du Félin (Once Upon the River Love, 1996 )
 Le Testament français, 1995, Mercure de France (Dreams of My Russian Summers, 1997 ; also published in English as Le Testament Francais)
 Le Crime d'Olga Arbelina, 1998, Mercure de France (Crime of Olga Arbyelina, 2000 )
 Requiem pour l'Est, 2000, Mercure de France (Requiem for a Lost Empire, 2001 )
 La Musique d'une vie, 2001, Éditions du Seuil (A Life's Music, 2004 ; also published as Music of a Life)
 La Terre et le ciel de Jacques Dorme, 2003, Mercure de France (The Earth and Sky of Jacques Dorme, 2005 )
 La Femme qui attendait, 2004, Éditions du Seuil (The Woman Who Waited, 2006 )
 L'Amour humain, 2006, Éditions du Seuil (Human Love, 2008 )
 Le Monde selon Gabriel, 2007, Éditions du Rocher 
 La Vie d'un homme inconnu, 2009, Éditions du Seuil (The Life of an Unknown Man, 2010 )
 Cette France qu'on oublie d'aimer, 2010, Points
 Le Livre des brèves amours éternelles, 2011, Éditions du Seuil (Brief Loves That Live Forever, 2013 )
 Une Femme Aimée, 2013, Éditions du Seuil (A woman loved, 2015)
 Le Pays du lieutenant Schreiber, 2014
 L'archipel d'une autre vie, 2016
 Au-delà des frontières, 2019
 L'Ami arménien, 2021, Éditions Grasset (Armenian Friend, 2021 )

As Gabriel Osmonde
 Le Voyage d'une femme qui n'avait plus peur de vieillir, Albin Michel, 2001
 Les 20 000 Femmes de la vie d'un homme, Albin Michel, 2004
 L'Œuvre de l'amour, Pygmalion, 2006
 Alternaissance, Pygmalion, 2011

References

External links
"A writer's life: Andreï Makine", Philip Delves Broughton, The Daily Telegraph, 28 March 2004
"Interview: Andrei Makine - Through the iron curtain to Paris", Natasha Fairweather, The Independent, 31 January 1999
 "Madame Bovary C’est Moi: An Interview With Andreï Makine", Gerry Feehily, 3:AM Magazine, 1 September 2008
French language links
 Site du collectif de chercheurs sur l'œuvre d'Andreï Makine Autour de l'œuvre d'Andreï Makine 
 
 Critical bibliography (Auteurs.contemporain.info) 
 Le Monde selon Gabriel voir le site:  Le Monde selon Gabriel 
 Murielle Lucie Clément, author of a PhD Thesis Andreï Makine. Présence de l'absence: une poétique de l'art (photographie, cinéma, musique) and many articles on this author.

1957 births
Living people
People from Penza
French people of Russian descent
Soviet emigrants to France
20th-century French novelists
21st-century French novelists
French male novelists
Prix Goncourt winners
Prix Médicis winners
Prix Goncourt des lycéens winners
Russian male novelists
Members of the Académie Française
20th-century French male writers
21st-century French male writers
Naturalized citizens of France